James Benton Hickey (January 22, 1920 – December 27, 1997) was an American football and basketball player, coach of football, and college athletics administrator.  He served as the head football coach at Hampden–Sydney College from 1951 to 1955 and at the University of North Carolina at Chapel Hill from 1959 to 1966, compiling a career college football record of 63–56–4.  Hickey was the athletic director at the University of Connecticut from 1966 to 1969.

Education and career
Hickey graduated from The College of William & Mary in 1942 and played wingback and tailback on the football team and guard on the basketball team. He was inducted into the William & Mary Athletics Hall of Fame in 1971. He served as a Lieutenant (junior grade) in the United States Navy during World War II. He coached football at Hampden–Sydney College for five years before joining the staff of Jim Tatum at the University of North Carolina in 1956 as an assistant. After Tatum's death in the summer of 1959, he accepted the position of head coach. Hickey was dismissed after the 1966 season and Bill Dooley succeeded him as North Carolina's head coach.

Family
Hickey was the son of William and Cora Hickey. He married Agnes Pauline Small Pardue on November 14, 1976, in Sanford, North Carolina. Hickey is buried in Buffalo Cemetery in Sanford.

Head coaching record

References

1920 births
1997 deaths
American football running backs
American football halfbacks
Guards (basketball)
UConn Huskies athletic directors
Hampden–Sydney Tigers athletic directors
Hampden–Sydney Tigers football coaches
North Carolina Tar Heels football coaches
William & Mary Tribe football players
William & Mary Tribe men's basketball players
United States Navy personnel of World War II
United States Navy officers
Players of American football from Pennsylvania
People from Sanford, North Carolina
American men's basketball players